Mike Siani (born May 27, 1950) is a former professional American football player who played wide receiver for nine seasons for the Oakland Raiders and Baltimore Colts.

Career
Siani was a high school football star with the New Dorp High School "Centrals", in New Dorp, Staten Island, New York City, New York, graduating in 1968. At New Dorp, Siani played for legendary coach Sal Somma.  Somma and Siani have been inducted into the Staten Island Sports Hall of Fame.

Siani attended Villanova University, where he not only played football but also excelled in baseball. Between 1968 (when he was still in high school) and 1972, Siani was drafted on four occasions by three Major League organizations (the New York Yankees, the Los Angeles Dodgers, and the Texas Rangers), but he never signed. 

On the football field Siani wore number 88 and earned close to 30 achievement awards.  He was selected to the 1971 College Football All-America Team. Siani was inducted into the Villanova University Sports Hall of Fame in 1988.

Siani was the first round draft choice of the Oakland Raiders.  In 1972, his first year in Oakland, he set multiple rookie team records for receiving and finished as the runner-up to Franco Harris as NFL Rookie of the Year.  He played for the Raiders through 1977, appearing in 74 games with 32 starts, and he caught 128 passes for 2,079 yards and 13 TDs. With the Raiders having a surplus of wide receivers, the team traded Siani along with a 1979 third-round selection (72nd overall–traded to Houston Oilers) to the Colts for Raymond Chester and a 1979 second-round pick (33rd overall–traded to Tampa Bay Buccaneers for Dave Pear) on July 21, 1978. Siani played three seasons with the Colts before finishing his NFL career in 1980.

When his playing career ended, Siani was an indoor football coach for several teams, being named the interim head coach for the Myrtle Beach Stingrays, Fayetteville Guard and Florence Phantoms. He was named the head coach of the Atlantic City CardSharks in 2004, and the Richmond Raiders of the American Indoor Football Association in 2010.  Siani has been employed as a scout for the New Orleans Saints, and was the quarterbacks and wide receivers coach for the Princeton Tigers Varsity Sprint Football program in 2009.

The Cincinnati Reds' 2018 draft choice with the same name is a distant relative of Siani's.

Books
“Cheating is Encouraged: A Hard-Nosed History of the 1970’s Raiders” was authored by Mike Siani and Kristine Setting Clark.

References

1950 births
Living people
American football wide receivers
Baltimore Colts players
Oakland Raiders players
Princeton Tigers football coaches
Sportspeople from Staten Island
Players of American football from New York City
Villanova Wildcats baseball players
Villanova Wildcats football players
New Dorp High School alumni
People from New Dorp, Staten Island